Samuel Black Hunter (November 5, 1855 – September 20, 1935) was a Canadian politician. He served in the Legislative Assembly of New Brunswick as member of the Liberal party representing York County from 1917 to 1925.

References

20th-century Canadian politicians
1855 births
1935 deaths
New Brunswick Liberal Association MLAs